This is the videography of the British rock band Queen.

References

Videographies of British artists